Paulina Eugenia Vodanovic Rojas (born 20 September 1971) is a Chilean politician who currently serves as president of the Socialist Party.

References

External links
 

1971 births
Living people
Chilean people
Chilean lawyers
21st-century Chilean politicians
Socialist Party of Chile politicians
University of Chile alumni